Caldwell Executive Airport  (formerly Treasure Valley Executive Airport at Caldwell)  is a city-owned public airport three miles (5 km) southeast of Caldwell, in Canyon County, Idaho, United States. The airport opened in 1976, replacing a smaller facility in downtown Caldwell.

Most U.S. airports use the same three-letter location identifier for the FAA and IATA, but Caldwell Executive Airport is assigned EUL by the FAA and has no IATA code.

Facilities and aircraft 
In the year ending June 21, 2007 the airport had 147,325 aircraft operations, average 403 per day: 98% general aviation, 1% air taxi and <1% military. 533 aircraft are based at this airport: 92% single-engine, 3% multi-engine, 3% ultralight, 2% helicopter and <1% jet. Although the airport does not serve commercial airline passengers, its runway is Idaho's busiest site for takeoffs and landings.

Airlines and destinations
There are no commercial airlines at this time.

Accidents and incidents
On June 27, 2019, at 6:45am, a Stinson plane, returning from a practice flight, lost engine power, and crashed into the south fence while attempting to land.  The pilot was Uninjured.

On August 26, 2022, around 4pm, a single engine aircraft crashed after losing power on take-off while attempting to circle back to the airport.

References

External links 
Caldwell Executive Airport at City of Caldwell website
Caldwell Executive Airport at Idaho Transportation Department

Airports in Idaho
Buildings and structures in Canyon County, Idaho
Transportation in Canyon County, Idaho
Caldwell, Idaho